Lateral condyle can refer to:
 Lateral condyle of tibia
 Lateral condyle of femur
 Lateral condyle of the distal humerus